WSBE may refer to:

 Washington State Board of Education, in the state of Washington
 Whittemore School of Business and Economics, at the University of New Hampshire
 WSBE-TV, licensed in Providence, Rhode Island